Hammamlar (also Romanized as Ḩammāmlār; also known as Hamānlār) is a village in Anzal-e Jonubi Rural District, Anzal District, Urmia County, West Azerbaijan Province, Iran. At the 2006 census, its population was 936, in 177 families. This village populated by Azerbaijani turks with Sunni Hanafi religion.

References 

Populated places in Urmia County